Papilio horribilis is a butterfly of the family Papilionidae. It is found in southern Guinea, Sierra Leone, Liberia, Ivory Coast, and Ghana.

The larvae possibly feed on Beilschmiedia manni.

Taxonomy
Papilio horribilis is a member of the hesperus species group. The members of the clade are:
Papilio hesperus Westwood, 1843
Papilio euphranor Trimen, 1868
Papilio horribilis Butler, 1874
Papilio pelodurus Butler, 1896

Status
The butterfly is not uncommon and not threatened.

See also
Mount Nimba Strict Nature Reserve

References

External links

Swallowtails

Butterflies described in 1874
horribilis
Butterflies of Africa
Taxa named by Arthur Gardiner Butler